is a private junior college in Kawanishi, Hyōgo, Japan.

External links
  

Educational institutions established in 1938
Universities and colleges in Hyōgo Prefecture
Japanese junior colleges
1938 establishments in Japan
Kawanishi, Hyōgo